Bauer is a German surname meaning "peasant" or "farmer". For notable people sharing the surname, see Bauer (surname).

Bauer may also refer to:

Education and literature 
 Bauer's Lexicon, a dictionary of Biblical Greek
 Bauer College of Business, the business school of the University of Houston
 Bauer Elementary, a school in Miamisburg, Ohio
 Bauer Hall, a residence hall at Cornell University

Entertainment and sport 
 Bauer (band), a Dutch band
 Bauer Media Group, a German publishing company
 Bauer Radio, its UK-based radio division
 Bauer (play), a 2014 play by Lauren Gunderson about the artist Rudolf Bauer

Industry 

 Bauer AG, a German construction and machinery manufacturing concern
 Bauer Pottery, an American pottery
 Bauer Type Foundry, a German type foundry
 Bauer Kompressoren, Germany, high pressure Gas compressor systems
 Bauer piping and pumps, Voitsberg, Austria, for irrigation and sewage

Military 
 USS Bauer (DE-1025), a Dealey-class destroyer escort in the United States Navy
 German submarine Wilhelm Bauer, a type XX1 U-boat

People 
 Bauer (surname)

Games and sport 
 Bauer (playing card) or Bower, another name for the Jack in certain card games
 Bauer Hockey, a manufacturer of bandy, field hockey and ice hockey equipment
 Estádio Augusto Bauer, a football stadium in Brusque, Brazil

See also 
 Bauer & Cie. v. O'Donnell, a 1913 U.S. Supreme Court case
 Boer (surname), Dutch equivalent of the surname
 Baauer (born 1989), music producer known for his song "Harlem Shake"
 Bower (disambiguation)
 Bowers (disambiguation)